Allen Township is a former township of Pope County, Arkansas. Part of Allen Township was given to Hogan Township some time between 1910 and 1920.

Cities, towns, and villages
 Treat

References

 United States National Atlas

External links
 US-Counties.com

Townships in Pope County, Arkansas
Populated places established in 1856
Townships in Arkansas